Arboles is an unincorporated town, and a census-designated place (CDP) located in and governed by Archuleta County, Colorado, United States. The Arboles post office has the ZIP code 81121. At the United States Census 2020, the population of the Arboles CDP was 308. The town's name means "trees" in Spanish.

Geography

Demographics

See also

Outline of Colorado
Index of Colorado-related articles
State of Colorado
Colorado cities and towns
Colorado census designated places
Colorado counties
Archuleta County, Colorado
Old Spanish National Historic Trail

References

External links

Arboles @ UncoverColorado.com
Arboles @ AllTrails.com
Archuleta County website

Census-designated places in Archuleta County, Colorado
Census-designated places in Colorado